Johny Joseph (September 27, 1964 – June 23, 2009) was a Haitian academic and journalist.

Joseph was born in Gonaïves.  He was news anchor for Télévision Nationale d'Haïti (HPN) from 1988 until 1990.

Joseph died of cancer at the l'hôpital du Canapé-Vert in Port-au-Prince, Haiti, on June 23, 2009, at the age of 45.

References

External links
Le Nouvelliste en Haiti: Décès du professeur Johnny Joseph (French)

1964 births
2009 deaths
Haitian journalists
Haitian academics
People from Port-au-Prince
People from Gonaïves
20th-century journalists